The 1988 European Taekwondo Championships were held in Ankara, Turkey. The event took place from 26 to 29 May, 1988.

Medal summary

Men

Women

References

External links 
 European Taekwondo Union

1988 in taekwondo
European Taekwondo Championships
International taekwondo competitions hosted by Turkey
1988 in European sport
1988 in Turkish sport
Sports competitions in Ankara